The Seven Countries Study is an epidemiological longitudinal study directed by Ancel Keys at what is today the University of Minnesota Laboratory of Physiological Hygiene & Exercise Science (LPHES). Begun in 1956 with a yearly grant of US$200,000 from the U.S. Public Health Service, the study was first published in 1978 and then followed up on its subjects every five years thereafter.

As the world's first multicountry epidemiological study, it systematically examined the relationships between lifestyle, diet, coronary heart disease and stroke in different populations from different regions of the world. It directed attention to the causes of coronary heart disease and stroke, but also showed that an individual’s risk can be changed.

As of 2016, heated scientific debate continues. Project officer Henry Blackburn wrote in 1975, "Two strikingly polar attitudes persist on this subject, with much talk from each and little listening between." Ian Leslie quotes a sympathetic colleague at the University of Minnesota who said Keys was "critical to the point of skewering”.

History

In the 1940s, a University of Minnesota researcher, Ancel Keys, postulated that the apparent epidemic of heart attacks in middle-aged American men was related to their mode of life and possibly modifiable physical characteristics. He first explored this idea in a group of Minnesota business and professional men (executives aged 45 to 55) that he recruited into a prospective study in 1947, the first of many cohort studies eventually mounted internationally. The U.S. Public Health Service agreed to fund the study (and then set up and proceeded to fund the Framingham Heart Study on a larger scale). The Minnesota men were followed through 1981 and the first major report appeared in 1963 after the fifteen-year follow-up study.

The study contributed much to survey methods and confirmed  larger studies that reported earlier on the predictive value for heart attack of several characteristics, the now-traditional risk factors of blood pressure and blood cholesterol level and cigarette smoking. Keys traveled widely with his wife Margaret who tested people's serum cholesterol. They sent their samples back to Minnesota for analysis. In 1952, Keys's hypothesis that coronary heart disease could be related to diet was first published in Voeding in The Netherlands. His work in post-wartime Naples led him to seek organization and funding for studies of different populations, as did his subsequent work in Uganda; Cape Town, South Africa; Sardinia; Bologna; and Ilomantsi, Finland; and with Japanese men living in Hawaii and in Japan. He decided to concentrate on men living in villages, rather than those in cities where the population moved around frequently.

In the mid-1950s, with improved methods and design, Keys recruited collaborating researchers in seven countries to mount the first cross-cultural comparison of heart attack risk in populations of men engaged in traditional occupations in cultures contrasting in diet, especially in the proportion of fat calories of different composition, the Seven Countries Study still under observation today.

The Seven Countries Study was formally started in fall 1958 in Yugoslavia. In total, 12,763 males, 40–59 years of age, were enrolled as 16 cohorts, in seven countries, in four regions of the world (United States, Northern Europe, Southern Europe, Japan). One cohort is in the United States, two cohorts in Finland, one in the Netherlands, three in Italy, five in Yugoslavia (two in Croatia, and three in Serbia), two in Greece, and two in Japan. The entry examinations were performed between 1958 and 1964 with an average participation rate of 90%, lowest in the US, with 75% and highest in one of the Japanese cohorts, with 100%. The study has continued for more than 50 years.

Major findings

The Seven Countries Study suggested that the risk and rates of heart attack and stroke (CVR), both at the population level and at the individual level, correlated directly and independently to the level of total serum cholesterol, in seven sampled out countries. It demonstrated that the correlation between blood cholesterol level and coronary heart disease (CHD) risk from 5 to 40 years follow-up is found consistently across different specially selected cultures in these seven countries. Cholesterol and obesity correlated with increased mortality from cancer. The Seven Countries Study suggested that elevated blood pressure (hypertension) was correlated with risk of coronary heart disease and stroke. It showed that the mortality rate after a coronary heart disease event or stroke was associated with the level of hypertension. In several cohorts of the study, stroke deaths exceeded deaths from coronary heart disease. It hinted that differences in overall mortality between the different regions of the seven countries are largely associated with variation in cardiovascular mortality. Coronary deaths in the United States and Northern Europe greatly exceeded those in Southern Europe, even when controlled for age, cholesterol, blood pressure, smoking, physical activity, and weight.

The Seven Countries Study was investigated further in regard to an eating pattern loosely characterized as the Mediterranean Diet. What exactly is meant by "Mediterranean Diet" today, was detailed by Antonia Trichopoulou (wife of Dimitrios Trichopoulos), and Anna Ferro-Luzzi. The diet was publicized and popularized by Greg Drescher of the Oldways Preservation and Exchange Trust and by Walter Willett of the Harvard School of Public Health.

The Seven Countries Study also showed that the slowly changing habits of a population in the Mediterranean region, from a healthy, active lifestyle and diet, to a less active lifestyle and a diet influenced by the Western pattern diet, significantly correlated with increased risk of heart disease. Meanwhile, it has been confirmed by other researchers that there is an inverse association between adherence to the Mediterranean Diet and the incidence of fatal and non- fatal heart disease in initially healthy middle-aged adults in the Mediterranean region.

The Seven Countries Study, along with other studies, e.g. the Framingham Heart Study, and the Nurses' Health Study, showed the importance of overweight, obesity, and regular exercise as health issues. It showed a correlation between good cardiovascular health and dementia in the general population. It also showed that cardiovascular risk factors in mid life are significantly associated with increased risk of dementia death later in life. It indicated that cigarette smoking is a highly significant predictor of the development of coronary heart disease, leading to excess rates of angina pectoris, myocardial infarction (MI), and coronary death, along with other studies about smoking, e.g. the Framingham Heart Study and the British Doctors Study.

Criticism

Early criticism

Scientists differed on the best predictors of heart disease. In 1950 in Science, John Gofman described separating lipoproteins into different densities in the ultracentrifuge. In 1952 as part of a panel with Keys, Gofman agreed that reducing fat in the diet might help some heart patients (and in this same issue of Circulation Keys explained that dietary cholesterol is not a factor in humans). In 1956 Gofman wrote that an atherogenic index (the combined levels of LDL and VLDL) predicted atherosclerosis and heart disease. In 1958 he wrote, "The serum cholesterol measurement can be a dangerously misleading guide in evaluation of the effect of diet upon the serum lipids."

Jacob Yerushalmy and Herman E. Hilleboe pointed out that Keys had selected six countries out of 21 for which data were available. Analysis of the full dataset made the analysis between fat intake and heart disease less clear. In 1957, when they published their critique, Yerushalmy and Hilleboe called Keys's work a "tenuous association". Published in 1973 and including his critique of Keys's work, Raymond Reiser found methodological and interpretational errors in a review of forty feeding trials of the relationship between saturated fat and circulating lipoproteins, notably confounding with trans-fatty acids.

George V. Mann, writing in the New England Journal of Medicine  in 1977, dismissed Keys's 1953 Mt. Sinai address about the ecologic correlation of diet fat and coronary disease as exhibiting "naïveté ... [that] is now a classroom demonstration.", he did  say that the lipid theory is "the greatest scam in the history of medicine"). Mann studied the mainly meat diet of Alaskan Eskimos, Congolese pygmies, and the Maasai of Tanzania and Kenya, and thought other factors like lack of exercise were responsible for heart disease. Yet contrary to Mann's assertion that despite wide official recommendations for dietary change “the [coronary heart disease (CHD)] epidemic continues unabated, cholesteremia in the population is unchanged, and clinicians are unconvinced of efficacy”, the age-specific CHD death rate in the United States had by that time been on a steady 3% annual decline since the late 1960s.

John Yudkin thought that sugar, not fat, was at the root of heart disease and other human ills. Keys wrote and promoted his disagreement in 1971. The next year Yudkin retired to write Pure, White and Deadly.

Debate since 2000

Robert Lustig criticized that Keys cherry-picked seven of 22 countries; consumption of trans-fat peaked in the 1960s and Keys failed to separate them out; results for Japan and Italy could be explained by either low saturated fat consumption or by low sugar consumption; and Keys wrote that sucrose and saturated fat were intercorrelated but failed to perform the sucrose half of his multivariate correlation analysis. However, in his later monograph of 1980, Keys included multivariate regressions in which sugar is added to the regression and saturated fat is controlled for. In this regression, Keys found that sugar was not statistically significantly related to incidence of heart disease when dietary saturated fat was controlled for. Today, sugar intake is known to increase the risk of diabetes mellitus, and increased dietary intake of sugar is known to be associated with higher blood pressure, unfavorable blood lipids and cardiometabolic risks. However, a 2010 conference debate of the American Dietetic Association expressed concern over the health risks of replacing saturated fats in the diet with refined carbohydrates, which carry a high risk of obesity and heart disease, particularly at the expense of polyunsaturated fats which may have health benefits.

In September 2014, Frank Hu led the 2015 Dietary Guidelines Advisory Committee's report on saturated fat and cardiovascular disease, and Alice H. Lichtenstein said that the consensus is that a low-fat diet is "probably not a good idea" and that it might induce dyslipidemia. She said that the guidelines had changed (formerly recommending low fat, and now moderate fat) in 2000, and that the American Heart Association and the National Heart, Lung, and Blood Institute had revised guidelines as of 2000. The group's Scientific Report of the 2015 Dietary Guidelines Advisory Committee says the average person in the U.S. consumes too much saturated fat. "Sources of saturated fat should be replaced with unsaturated fat, particularly polyunsaturated fatty acids."

A meta-analysis in March 2014 met with controversy, finding that "current evidence does not clearly support cardiovascular guidelines that encourage high consumption of polyunsaturated fatty acids and low consumption of total saturated fats",  with Walter C. Willett continuing to defend reduced saturated fat in the diet. It was later corrected. As of 2017, the American Heart Association recommends that saturated fat be reduced or replaced by products containing monounsaturated and polyunsaturated fats to reduce the risk of cardiovascular diseases.

On August 1, 2017, the True Health Initiative released a 65-page white paper, correcting what they felt were historical inaccuracies and errors that low-carb advocates have perpetuated: "Ancel Keys and the Seven Countries Study: An Evidence-based Response to Revisionist Histories" They argued against four claims: that countries were selected and excluded based on desired outcome (as posited by Robert Lustig in his viral video); France was purposefully excluded; dietary data in Greece taken during Lent introduced a distortion; and that sugar was not considered as a possible contributor to coronary heart disease.

See also
 Lipid hypothesis

References

External links
 The Seven Countries Study (official website)
 Seven Countries: A Multivariate Analysis of Death and Coronary Heart Disease
 A personal historical account by one of the researchers
 Ancel Keys and the Seven Countries Study: An Evidence-based Response to Revisionist Histories 

Epidemiological study projects
Heart
Cohort studies